Demak Great Mosque (Pegon: مَسْجِد اَڮَوڠ دَمَق) is one of the oldest mosques in Indonesia, located in the center town of Demak, Central Java, Indonesia. The mosque is believed to be built by the Wali Songo ("Nine Muslim Saints") with the most prominent figure Sunan Kalijaga, during the first Demak Sultanate ruler, Raden Patah during the 15th century.

Features 
Although it has had a number of renovations, it is thought to be largely in its original form. It is a classic example of a traditional Javanese mosque. Unlike mosques in the Middle East it is built from timber. Rather than a dome, which did not appear on Indonesian mosques until the 19th century, the roof is tiered and supported by four saka guru teak pillars. The tiered roof shows many similarities with wooden religious structures from the Hindu-Buddhist civilizations of Java and Bali. The main entrance of Masjid Agung Demak consists of two doors carved with motifs of plants, vases, crowns and an animal head with an open wide-toothed mouth. It is said that picture depicts the manifested thunder caught by Ki Ageng Selo, hence their name Lawang Bledheg (the doors of thunder). Like other mosques of its era, its orientation towards Mecca is only approximate.

Carving and historical relics 

Its walls contain Vietnamese ceramics. With their shapes derived from conventions of Javanese woodcarving and brickwork, they are thought to have been specially ordered. The use of ceramic rather than stone is thought to have been in imitation of the mosques of Persia.

Gallery

See also

 Islam in Indonesia
 Indonesian architecture

References

Demak Regency
Mosques in Indonesia
Religious buildings and structures in Central Java
Cultural Properties of Indonesia in Central Java
Religious buildings and structures completed in 1479
Demak